The Glasflügel 401 "Kestrel" is a glider that was developed in 1968 for the open class. It has a wingspan of 17 metres. It is named after the kestrel bird.

History
Between 1968 and 1975 Glasflügel built 129 Kestrels. 

The British company Slingsby built the Kestrel under license as the T59 and T59B. The T59B has a wingspan of 19 metres and was developed for the 1970 World Gliding Championships.

On 18 May 2005, Gordon Boettger flew 2061 km in his Kestrel in lee waves along the Sierra Nevada in the USA.

Specifications

See also

Notes

References

 Flight Manual
 Die Entwicklung der Kunststoffsegelflugzeuge, Dietmar Geistmann, Motorbuchverlag, 
 Sailplane Directory

1960s German sailplanes
Glasflügel aircraft
T-tail aircraft
Aircraft first flown in 1968